Alexandra Lucía Jean Salvador Duthie (born 11 August 1995) is a Canadian-born Ecuadorian professional footballer who plays as a defender or midfielder for American college team Alcorn State Lady Braves and the Ecuador national team. She serves as the captain for the Lady Braves.

Salvador was part of the Ecuadorian squad for the 2015 FIFA Women's World Cup. She also had a brief stint in the Ecuadorian league playing for San Francisco. She was raised in Waterloo, Ontario, Canada.

References

External links
 
 

1995 births
Living people
People with acquired Ecuadorian citizenship
Ecuadorian women's footballers
Women's association football midfielders
Alcorn State Lady Braves soccer players
Ecuador women's international footballers
2015 FIFA Women's World Cup players
Pan American Games competitors for Ecuador
Footballers at the 2015 Pan American Games
Ecuadorian expatriate footballers
Ecuadorian expatriate sportspeople in the United States
Expatriate women's soccer players in the United States
21st-century Ecuadorian women
People from Halton Hills
Soccer people from Ontario
Canadian women's soccer players
Canadian expatriate women's soccer players
Canadian expatriate sportspeople in the United States
Canadian people of Ecuadorian descent
Sportspeople of Ecuadorian descent